Jim Board (born 17 February 1956) is a former Australian rules footballer who played with Collingwood in the Victorian Football League (VFL).  

Jeremy (Jim) Board, was also, (up to the year 2023), a teacher at the Mount Barker Waldorf School, having taught several rounds of children as their primary teacher up through grades one to seven. He is husband to wife Julie Board, with whom he has fathered and grandfathered children. Jeremy is a well beloved member of both the Mount Barker community and Waldorf/Steiner community broadly.

Notes

External links 		

{http://www.mtbarkerwaldorf.sa.edu.au/newsletter/story.php?authorId=28} from Mount Barker Waldorf School
		
		

1956 births
Australian rules footballers from Victoria (Australia)		
Collingwood Football Club players
South Warrnambool Football Club players
Living people